Africa Alive! Zoological Reserve, formerly known as Africa Alive! and Suffolk Wildlife Park, is a zoo located in Kessingland, Suffolk, UK.

Africa Alive! Zoological Reserve is part of the Zoological Society of East Anglia, a registered charity, and a member of the World Association of Zoos and Aquariums (WAZA), the European Association of Zoos and Aquaria (EAZA), and the British and Irish Association of Zoos and Aquariums (BIAZA).

With thousands of animals from around the world, set in over 100 acres of stunning countryside, Africa Alive Zoological Reserve is the perfect place to set your sights on some of Africa's most iconic animals, whilst learning more about their natural instincts, habitats and conservation. The spectacular centrepiece of the reserve is the ‘Plains of Africa’ display where guests can see five species of African Savannah animals roaming together, including majestic Giraffe and heavyweight Rhinos. The Discovery Centre operates regular animal handling sessions for a chance to get hands on with some of the smaller animals.

The reserve also offers a great outdoor play area, as well as restaurants, free parking, disabled facilities and a gift shop.

History

Suffolk Wildlife Park was acquired by Banham Zoo in 1991 with the idea of creating an animal park hosting some animals bred in their zoo, without having to transfer them long distances. The theme of `animals from the African continent' was decided upon when the park was created. On Tuesday 21 March 2006, the Park officially rebranded as Africa Alive! Africa Alive! along with Banham Zoo became a charity in 2013 under the Zoological Society of East Anglia. In February 2022, a part of the lion enclosure's fence was smashed by a fallen tree during Storm Eunice. The ZSEA launched a fundraiser to meet the costs of the damage, which had reached over £63,000.

Animals
Africa Alive! Zoological Reserve is an African themed zoo, and has the following species:

Primates: 
Mongoose lemur
Sclater's lemur 
Drill 
Chimpanzee 
King colobus 
Black lemur 
Ring-tailed lemur 
Black-and-white ruffed lemur 
Crowned lemur 
Red-bellied lemur

Other mammals: 
Fossa 
African crested porcupine 
Aardvark
Meerkat
Short-clawed otter
Straw-coloured fruit bat 
Cameroon sheep 
Somali black-headed sheep
African hunting dog 
Somali wild ass 
Congo buffalo 
African lion 
Barbary sheep 
Southern white rhinoceros 
Cheetah 
Reticulated giraffe 
Blesbok 
Chapman's zebra 
Domestic water buffalo 
Bongo 
Sitatunga 
Lowland nyala 
Nile lechwe
Kafue Flats lechwe
Rock hyrax
African pygmy goat 
Domestic rabbit 
Guinea pig

Birds: 
Greater flamingo 
Grey crowned crane 
Demoiselle crane 
White stork 
Helmeted guineafowl
White-faced scops owl 
Kenyan eagle owl
Grey parrot
Greater vasa parrot
Milky eagle owl 
Egyptian vulture 
Hamerkop 
Black-masked lovebird
Superb starling 
Ostrich

Reptiles and invertebrates: 
Royal python 
African land snail 
Madagascan hissing cockroach 
Plated lizard 
Leopard tortoise 
Spur-thighed tortoise

References

External links

 

Zoos in England
Tourist attractions in Suffolk
Buildings and structures in Suffolk